The 2017 AFF Futsal Championship will be the 14th edition of the tournament. The tournament will be second AFF Futsal Championship to be held in 2017, with the first one originally meant to be hosted in 2016 to be held in early 2017.

The tournament served as qualifiers for the 2018 AFC Futsal Championship.

Draw

The draw was held on 17 February 2017 during the AFF Council Meeting at the Novotel Yangon Max Hotel in Yangon, Myanmar. A redraw was held in September 2017 due to the withdrawal of Australia.

Venue
The all matches was held at the Phú Thọ Indoor Stadium in Ho Chi Minh City.

Group stage
All matches are to be played in Vietnam. Times listed are UTC+7.

In the event the Philippines, Timor Leste or both finish among the top two teams in their group the next best team/s qualify for the 2018 AFC Futsal Championship instead since both countries did not submit their entries for the said continental tournament.

Group A

Group B

Knockout stage
In the knockout stage, extra time and penalty shoot-out are used to decide the winner if necessary, excluding the third place match.

Bracket

Semi-finals

Third place match

Final

Winner

Goalscorers 
13 goals

 Muhammad Osamanmusa

12 goals

 Pyae Phyo Maung (3)

10 goals

 Phùng Trọng Luân

8 goals

 Mohd Khairul Effendy
 Ngô Ngọc Sơn
 Trần Thái Huy

6 goals

 Ardiansyah
 Syauqi Saud
 Peerapol Satsue
 Jetsada Chudech

5 goals

 Abdul Rohmano Nawawi
 Bruno Gomes
 Vũ Quốc Hùng

4 goals

 Bambang Bayu Saptaji
 Muhammad Subhan Faidasa
 Soulichanh Phasawaeng
 Akmarulnizam Idris
 Nyein Min Soe
 Chaivat Jamgrajang
 Nattawut Madyalan
 Weerasak Srichai
 Lê Quốc Nam

3 goals

 Awaluddin Nawi
 Aung Aung
 Hlaing Min Tun
 Khin Zaw Lin
 Naing Ye Kyaw
 Nawin Rattanawongswa
 Danh Phát
 Nguyễn Minh Trí
 Phạm Đức Hòa

2 goals

 Faiz Bin Hasnan
 Johanis Dominggus Mustamu
 Randy Satria Mushar
 Nidnilanh Chanchaleune
 Abu Haniffa Hasan
 Muhammad Azri Rahman
 Mohd Azwann Ismail
 Aung Zin Oo
 Hein Min Soe
 Ko Ko Lwin
 Myo Myint Soe
 Pyae Phyo Maung (2)
 Sai Pyone Aung
 Sorasak Phoonjungreed
 Warut Wangsama-aeo
 Ronnachai Jungwongsuk
 Đinh Văn Toàn

1 goal

 Maziri Bin Maidin
 Muhammad Naqib Bin Pg Timbang
 Raimi
 Aditya Muhammad Rasyid
 Alexander Benhard Larawo
 Guntur Sulistyo Ariwibowo
 Mochammad Iqbal Rahmattulah
 Sunny Rizky Suhendra
 Chanthaphone Waenvongsoth
 Khampha Phiphakkhavong
 Phonephet Sihabouth
 Kyaw Kyaw Tun
 Kyaw Soe Moe
 Panat Kittipanuwong
 Thanachot Sosawong
 Ilidio Nunes
 Mu Kui Sen
 Remigio Duarte
 Cổ Trí Kiệt
 Khổng Đình Hùng
 Nguyễn Văn Huy
 Trần Văn Vũ
 Vũ Xuân Du

1 own goal

 Julian Pio Miranda (playing against Indonesia)
 Lorenzo Hermosa (playing against Myanmar)
 Chaivat Jamgrajang (playing against Myanmar)
 Andre Vong (playing against Thailand)

References

External links
 Official website

AFF Futsal Championship
AFF 2017
International futsal competitions hosted by Vietnam
2017 in Vietnamese football
AFF Futsal Championship
AFF Futsal Championship